The following is a timeline of the history of the city of Tabriz, capital of East Azerbaijan Province in Iran.

Prior to 15th century

 714 BCE. –  Mentioned in Assyrian King Sargon II's epigraph
 2nd to 7th C. BCE The earliest elements of the present Tabriz are claimed to be built either at the time of the early Sassanids in the 3rd or 4th century AD, or later in the 7th century. The Middle Persian name of the city was T'awrēš.
 8th C. CE – Tabriz Bazaar construction begins.
 858 CE – A devastating earthquake happened in Tabriz.
 1041 – A devastating earthquake happened in Tabriz.
 1208 – Annexed by the army of Kingdom of Georgia under command of brothers Ivane and Zakaria Mkhargrdzeli.
 1275 – Marco Polo traveled through Tabriz on his way to China.
 1298 – Sham-i Ghazan built (approximate date).
 1299 – City becomes Ilkhanid capital.
 1300 – Rab'-e Rashidi (academic center) built.
 1305 – Ghazaniyya (tomb) built.
 1311 – Masjid-i Alishah built (approximate date).
 1314 – Madrasa of Sayyid Hamza built.
 1320 – Arg of Tabriz built.
 1330 – Dimishqiyya built (approximate date).
 1340 – Masjid-i Ustad-Shagird and Alaiyya built.
 1356/1357 – City is briefly occupied by the Muzafarrids
 1370 – Imarat-i Shaikh Uvais built (approximate date).
 1375 – City becomes capital of Kara Koyunlu territory.
 1392 – City besieged by Timur.

15th–16th centuries

 1406 – Kara Koyunlu in power.
 1465 – Blue Mosque and Muzaffariyya built.
 1468 – Uzun Hasan in power.
 1469 – City becomes part of Ak Koyunlu territory.
 1472 – Capital relocates to Tabriz from Amid.
 1475 – Masjid-i Hasan Padshah and Maqsudiyya built (approximate date).
 1478 – Nasiriyya built.
 1483 – Hasht Bihisht palace built.
 1500 – Population: 300,000 (approximate). The fifth most populated city in the world.
 1501 – Safavid Ismail I in power.
 1514
 5 September: City taken by Ottoman Selim I.
 Safavids in power.
 1534 – Ottomans in power.
 1535 – Safavids in power.
 1548
 Ottomans in power, succeeded by Safavids.
 Capital relocates from Tabriz to Qazvin.
 1555 – Persians in power per Treaty of Amasya.
 1571 – Uprising.
 1585 – Ottomans in power.

17th–18th centuries

 1603 – Safavids in power.
 1610 – Ottomans in power.
 1611 – Safavids in power.
 1635 – City sacked by Ottoman Murad IV.
 1636 – Saheb-ol-Amr Mosque built.
 1641 – Earthquake kills thousands and destroys the city.
 1655 – Madrasa Sadiqiyya built.
 1673 – Population: 550,000.
 1676 – Madrasa Talibiyya built.
 1721 – Earthquake kills eighty thousands.
 1724 – Ottomans in power.
 1724/25 Ottoman invaders killed about 200,000 city residents.
 1730 – Safavids in power.
 1736 – City becomes part of Afshar territory.
 1747 – City becomes part of Khanate of Tabriz.
 1757 – Mohammad Hasan Khan Qajar takes city.
 1762 – City incorporated into Zand realm.
 1775 – Earthquake.
 1780 – 28 February: Earthquake kills about 200,000 city residents.
 Population: about 30,000.
 1785 – Qajars in power.
 1799 – Qajar prince Abbas Mirza appointed as the governor of the city.

19th century
 1808 – Population: 250,000 (estimate).
 1817 – Printing press in operation.
 1826 – Russians take city.
 1827 – City becomes part of Russian Empire.
 1828 – Qajars took power in the city.
 1830 – Cholera outbreak.
 1860 – Tehran-Tabriz telegraph begins operating.
 1868 – Constitution House of Tabriz built.
 1881
 Population: 165,000 (estimate).
 American Memorial School in Tabriz established.

20th century

1900s–1940s

 1908 – Sardar Homayun Vali Qasem appointed as Tabriz first mayor.
 1909
 19 April: Howard Baskerville, the American teacher in Tabriz and a supporter of constitutionals, got killed in battle.
 29 April: Russians Cossacks take city.
 29 April: Monarchists siege of the city failed with arrival of Russian forces.
 1910 – Population: 200,000 (approximate).
 1911:
 December: Occupation of Tabriz by Russian army in 1911.
 30 December: Seqat-ol-Eslam executed with 10 other constitutionals and nationalists by Russian Cossacks.
 1915 – Tabriz Occupied by Ottoman forces during Invasion of Tabriz, World War I
 1916 – Jolfa-Tabriz railway begins operating.
 1917
 Tabriz Fire Fighting Tower built.
 Tavakoli matches factory established as one of the first private factories.
1918
 28 February: Russian retreat from Tabriz completed. 
 28 February: Ismaeil Nowbari head of local Democrat party took control of the city.
 18 June: Tabriz occupied by Ottoman forces.
 1920
 4 September: Iranian Cossacks take control of the city after retreating of Ottoman forces.
 Late summer: Khiyabani's revolution suppressed with help of Cossacks.
 1921 – Tarbiat library established.
 1922
 1 February: Major Lahuti's revolt take control of Tabriz.
 7 February: Major Lahuti's revolt crashed. Persian Cossacks take control of the city.
 1925 – City becomes part of Imperial State of Persia.
 1934 –
 Tabriz Municipality Palace built.
 A major flood caused a lot of damages to central parts of the city, including Ali Qapu.
 1937 – City becomes capital of Eastern Azerbaijan province.
 1941 – Tabriz occupied by Red Army as part of Anglo-Soviet invasion of Iran.
 1945 – November – City becomes capital of Azerbaijan People's Government.
University of Azerbaijan established
 1946
 Soviet troops retreat from the city.
 November: Azerbaijan People's Government collapsed by Iranian Imperial Army.
 1947 - Tabriz University of Medical Sciences established.

1950s–1990s
 1950 – Tabriz International Airport begins operating.
 1951 – Azarbayijan-i ayandah newspaper begins publication.
 1956
 Tabriz National Library founded.
 Takhti Stadium (Tabriz) opens.
 1958 – Azerbaijan Museum established.
 1963 – Population: 387,803 (estimate).
 1967 – As a beginning point to industrialization of the city Mashin Sazi Tabriz factory is established.
 1968 – Iran Tractor Manufacturing Company (the biggest industrial complex in northwest of Iran at the time) established in Tabriz.
 1969 – Machine Sazi Football Club formed.
 1970 – Tractor Sazi Tabriz Football Club formed.
 1973 – Reconstruction of Blue Mosque is accomplished.
 1976 – June: Part of 1976 AFC Asian Cup's final tournament held in Baghe Shomal stadium, Tabriz.
 1977 – 12 December: students' protest in University of Tabriz in anniversary of establishment of provincial government of Azerbaijan, was brutally attacked by the military units.
 1978
 February: As part of Iranian refinery complexes Tabriz oil refinery is established.
 18 February: The protest against shah became violent after one of the protesters shot dead. This incidence intensified the rise up of people through the country for revolution of 1979.
 1979
 February: City becomes part of Islamic Republic of Iran
 December: large protest against unfair treatment of Azerbaijani minorities.
 Varliq, a quarterly publication Azerbaijani magazine established.
 1980
 March: Protest in support challenging the new constitution suppressed brutally by central government.
 September: Air strike on Tabriz Airport and Tabriz Oil Refinery by Iraqi Air force at the first day of Iran–Iraq War.
 1982 – Population: 852,000 (estimate).
 1986
 Azerbaijan Cycling Tour (race) begins.
 Shahrdari Tabriz Cultural and Athletic Club formed.
 1989
 Sahand University of Technology established.
 Azarbaijan Shahid Madani University established.
 Tiz'houshan high schools established.
 1992
 Tabriz International Exhibition begins.
 East Azerbaijan Province split into a smaller East Azerbaijan Province, and Ardabil Province.
 1995 – 21 May: Student protest against unfair treatment of Azerbaijani minority by IRIB.
 1996
 Yadegar-e Emam Stadium and Museum of Constitution open.
 Population: 1,191,043.
 1997 - Tabriz Islamic Arts University established.
 1998
 Hossein Farhangpour becomes mayor.
 Tabriz Petrochemical Co is established.
 1999
 Student protest to support Tehran University's student movement for more political freedom.
 Tabriz Art University established.
 2000 – Provincial TV station of Sahand begins broadcasting.

21st century

 2001 – Ehtesham Hajipour selected as new mayor of the city.
 2002 – April: Tabriz Cartoon, an international annual cartoon contest started.
 2006
 Alireza Navin selected as new mayor of Tabriz.
 Amir Nezam House museum and Iron Age Museum open.
 May – Thousands of ethnic Azeris demonstrated in Tabriz against government official newspaper's (Iran) cartoon insulting Azerbaijani minority.
 2009 – Gostaresh Foolad Football Club formed.
 2010 – Bazaar Complex is inscribed as World Heritage Site.
 2011
 August: A protest for saving Lake Urmia is suppressed by police.
 Population: 1,494,998.
 2012
 18 February: Construction of the tallest building in city, Bloor Tower, is accomplished.
 11 August: A major earthquake in Varzaqan shocked Tabriz.
 Air pollution in Tabriz reaches annual mean of 40 PM2.5 and 68 PM10, more than recommended.
 2013
 14 June: Local election held.
 15 June: Thousands of city residents came to streets to celebrate the victory of Iranian moderate presidential candidate, Hassan Rowhani.
 November: Sadegh Najafi-Khazarlou is selected as the 55th mayor of Tabriz.
 2014
 29 March: Tabriz celebrated the earth hour for the first time by turning off Saat Tower's lights.
 25 December: Tabriz Soccer Museum is established.
 City becomes part of newly formed national administrative Region 3.
 2015
 27 August: First portion of Tabriz Metro started its services.
 2017
 4 November: Iraj Shahin-Baher is selected as the 56th mayor of Tabriz.

See also
 Tabriz history
 Timelines of other cities in Iran: Bandar Abbas, Hamadan, Isfahan, Kerman, Mashhad, Qom, Shiraz, Tehran, Yazd

References

This article incorporates information from the Azerbaijani Wikipedia, Turkish Wikipedia, and Croatian Wikipedia.

Bibliography

External links

  (Bibliography)
 Items related to Tabriz, various dates (via Europeana)
 Items related to Tabriz, various dates (via Digital Public Library of America)

Images

Tabriz in 19th century

Tabriz during constitutional revolution

Tabriz invasion during WWII

Tabriz
 
Years in Iran